The United Kingdom Atomic Energy Authority Constabulary was the armed security police force of the United Kingdom Atomic Energy Authority. The force existed for 50 years, operating from 1955, until 1 April 2005.

On 1 April 2005, the Civil Nuclear Constabulary (CNC) was established in adherence to the Energy Act 2004, replacing the UKAEA Constabulary largely because a number of nuclear sites were poorly guarded, a force with more specialist attributes was needed to combat the possibility of terrorist threats and it was seen as an essential part of making the force independent of any one of the nuclear operators. The force was made up of 650 armed personnel (the majority of whom were from the UKAEA Constabulary), protecting sixteen atomic sites and protecting transportation of nuclear materials around the United Kingdom and abroad. At that time UKAEAC/CNC came under the Department for Trade and Industry.

See also
Civil Nuclear Constabulary

References

External links
Civil Nuclear Constabulary Website

1955 establishments in the United Kingdom
Defunct police forces of the United Kingdom
2005 disestablishments in the United Kingdom
Nuclear power in the United Kingdom
Nuclear security agencies